Wyoming Highway 73 (WYO 73) is a  long east-west Wyoming state highway that runs from northwestern Carbon County to northeastern Sweetwater County. Highway 73 provides access to the town of Bairoil.

Route description
Wyoming Highway 73 begins its west end at the city limits for Bairoil, in Sweetwater County, just east of an intersection with Bairoil Dr.
From there Highway 73 travels east into Carbon County and terminates at U.S. Route 287 and Highway 789 in Lamont.

Major intersections

References

External links

 Wyoming Routes 000-099
 WYO 73 - US 287/WYO 789 to Bairoil

Transportation in Carbon County, Wyoming
Transportation in Sweetwater County, Wyoming
073